America is a 2022 romantic drama film written and directed by Ofir Raul Graizer. It follows a swimming coach, who returns to Israel from the United States after his father's death, and his childhood friend's fiancée, who is a florist.

The film premiered in competition at the Karlovy Vary International Film Festival, as did Graizer's previous film The Cakemaker, on 5 July 2022. It is also set to screen in competition at the Jerusalem Film Festival in July 2022.

Cast
 Oshrat Ingedashet as Iris
 Michael Moshonov as Eli
 Ofri Biterman as Yotam
 Moni Moshonov as Moti
 Irit Sheleg as Orna
 Evelyn Shafir as Dr. Margarita
 Ruba Blal Asfour as Dr. Ruba
 Lukas Henri Kropat as Josh
 Or Butbul as Moshiko

Production
Graizer conceived of the film in Chicago when he visited the United States for the first time when The Cakemaker was invited to a festival. According to Graizer, the title America symbolises "a place of longing" and "a distant dream" he had as a child growing up in Israel in the 1980s.

The film was shot in 2020 in Tel Aviv and Berlin. Graizer's husband Daniel Kossow, a production designer and florist, designed the flower shop.

Reception
Neil Young of Screen International wrote, "while heart-tugging sentiment is not entirely shunned ... it is handled with sufficient tact and sensitivity to heighten rather than cheapen the story's overall impact." Young found the title incongruous with the film's "engagingly genial, straightforward air". Guy Lodge of Variety wrote that the film "braids blunt melodramatic storytelling with a softer, more searching look at conflicted identity", adding, "If the film isn't always narratively credible, it's sincerely felt to the last."

References

External links
 

2022 films
2022 romantic drama films
Israeli drama films
German romantic drama films
Czech romantic drama films
2020s Hebrew-language films
2020s English-language films
Films set in Tel Aviv
Films shot in Berlin
Films shot in Israel
2022 multilingual films
Israeli multilingual films
German multilingual films
Czech multilingual films